Janiak is a surname. Notable people with the surname include:

Andrew Janiak, American professor of philosophy
Claude Janiak (born 1948), Swiss politician and lawyer
Edward Janiak (1952-2021), Polish bishop and theologian
Jeff Janiak (born 1976), American/British punk rock singer and songwriter for Discharge (band)